There are a number of national symbols of Luxembourg, representing Luxembourg or its people in either official or unofficial capacities.

Under Luxembourgian law, 'national emblem' is strictly-defined as the national anthem, the national flag, the national coat of arms, and the national civil ensign.  However, there are many other symbols, both official and unofficial, that symbolise the Luxembourgian nation in the public consciousness.

List of national french symbols

Official symbols
 Head of state - Grand Duke of Luxembourg (currently Henri)
 National anthem - Ons Heemecht 
 National coat of arms - Coat of arms of Luxembourg 
 National flag - Flag of Luxembourg
 National holiday - Grand Duke's Official Birthday (23 June)
 National language - Luxembourgish

Unofficial symbols
 National animal - Red lion
 National bird - Goldcrest (Regulus regulus)
 National epic - Reynard
 National family - Grand Ducal Family
 National flower - Rose
 National monument - Gëlle Fra
 National motto - Mir wëlle bleiwe wat mir sinn (Luxembourgish for 'We wish to remain what we are')
 National patron saint - Willibrord

Footnotes

References